Katedralskolan (Sw: "the cathedral school") is a high school in Växjö, Sweden.

History
Katedralskolan in Växjö has a long history, receiving the right to become an upper secondary school ("Gymnasium" in Swedish) in 1643. It thus became the sixth Swedish gymnasium. Today Katedralskolan has 1300 students and five educational programs.

Programs
ES (Esthetics)
IB (International Baccalaureate)
ID (Athletics)
HU (Humanities)
NV (Natural Sciences)
SP (Social Sciences)
EK (Economy)

External links
Official website 

Gymnasiums (school) in Sweden
International Baccalaureate schools in Sweden